Jayantha Samaraweera (born 20 December 1968) is a Sri Lankan politician and member of the Parliament of Sri Lanka.

References

Living people
Members of the 13th Parliament of Sri Lanka
Members of the 15th Parliament of Sri Lanka
Members of the 16th Parliament of Sri Lanka
Janatha Vimukthi Peramuna politicians
Jathika Nidahas Peramuna politicians
United People's Freedom Alliance politicians
1968 births